2112 (pronounced "twenty-one twelve") is the fourth studio album by Canadian rock band Rush, released on 1 April 1976 (or March 1976, according to some sources) by Anthem Records.

Rush finished touring for their unsuccessful previous album Caress of Steel in early 1976. The band was in financial hardship due to the album's disappointing sales, unfavourable critical reception, and a decline in attendance at its shows. The band's international label, Mercury Records, considered dropping Rush but granted the band one more album following negotiations with manager Ray Danniels. Though the label demanded more commercial material, the band decided to continue developing its progressive rock sound. 2112 was recorded in February 1976 in Toronto with regular producer Terry Brown. Its centerpiece is the 20-minute title track, a futuristic science-fiction song that takes up the entire first side of the album. There are five individual tracks on side two.

2112 was released to favourable reviews from music critics and quickly outsold the band's previous albums. It peaked at No. 5 on the Canadian Albums Chart and No. 61 on the US Billboard Top LPs & Tape and was the band's commercial breakthrough in the country. Rush supported the album with a tour of the United States, Canada, and for the first time, Europe, from February 1976 to June 1977. 2112 remains the band's second-highest-selling album (behind 1981's Moving Pictures) with more than 3 million copies sold in the United States. It is listed in 1001 Albums You Must Hear Before You Die, and ranked second on Rolling Stones reader's poll, Your Favorite Prog Rock Albums of All Time. 2112 has been reissued several times; a 40th Anniversary Edition was released in 2016 with previously unreleased material, including the album performed by artists including Dave Grohl, Taylor Hawkins, Billy Talent,  Steven Wilson, and Alice in Chains.

Background 
In January 1976, Rush ended its 1975–1976 tour to support the band's third studio album, Caress of Steel. The band members had enjoyed writing and recording the album, but Lifeson recalled the group in a state of confusion after the tour, sensing the disappointing reaction from crowds after playing songs from it on stage. The progressive rock-themed album with lengthy, story-based songs, complex song structures, and hard-to-grasp lyrics, made it difficult to receive radio airplay and promote effectively. Lee said the band could not understand the underwhelming response, and later dubbed the tour the "Down the Tubes Tour" as the band members struggled to meet their $125-a-week salary while crowds declined. Lee added, "That really shakes your confidence. We were so confused and disheartened." In 1980, Lifeson said this was the only moment in Rush history when he felt close to giving up.

The band's international label, Mercury Records, considered dropping them. Rush manager Ray Danniels flew to the label's head offices in Chicago to try to regain confidence and spoke highly of the band's new ideas for a new album without having heard any of it. Mercury approved one more album. Despite pressure from the label and management to make a more commercial record, the band ignored the advice and proceeded with material as they saw fit. Lifeson said, "I remember having these conversations about, 'What are we going to do? Are we going to try to make another mini-Led Zeppelin record or are we going to do what we are going to do and continue forward and whatever happens, happens?' ... We fully intended to [not] go down in flames but we were prepared to do that."

Production

Writing and recording 
Rush began to put down musical ideas for 2112 in backstage dressing rooms, hotel rooms and in their touring van during the Caress of Steel tour. As Peart started to write lyrics, Lee and Lifeson would write music that complemented the mood of what Peart was writing about. Most of it was performed on acoustic guitars with the exception of some electric guitar passages with a portable Pignose practice amplifier. They focused on writing music with little need for overdubbing, as they wished to recreate it on stage as much as possible. Lifeson recalled developing "The Temples of Syrinx" backstage at a gig in Sault Ste. Marie, Ontario in front of their opening act Mendelson Joe. The album was written in approximately six months, with "Overture" being the final piece developed. Rush made a conscious effort to exclude Danniels from the writing and recording sessions, and only played the album to him when it was finished. Musically speaking, 2112 was the first album that Lifeson said "really sounded like Rush".

2112 was recorded in February 1976 across four weeks at Toronto Sound Studios, with longtime associate Terry Brown assuming his role as producer. The studio was fitted with a 24-track machine manufactured by Studer. Lifeson plays a 1968 Gibson ES-335 for the majority of the electric guitar parts on 2112, with some lead parts played on a Gibson Les Paul Standard. For the acoustic sections, he plays a 12-string Gibson B-45 and a six-string Gibson Dove. His amplifiers were the Fender Super Reverb and a Twin Reverb. A section of "Discovery" features Lifeson playing a Fender Stratocaster that he borrowed from a friend. At the time of recording 2112, Lee was using a Rickenbacker 4001 bass with stereo output; Brown fed one channel directly into the mixing board and then into a compressor, and the other was channelled into Lee's Electro-Voice speakers turned up to the maximum. Upon completing the album, the band expressed an interest in recording in another studio to explore different sounds. Their next album, A Farewell to Kings, was recorded in Wales.

Songs

Side one 
Side one of the album is occupied by the 20-minute futuristic science fiction suite "2112". The seven-part track is based on a story by Peart, the band's primary lyricist, who credits "the genius of Ayn Rand" in the album's liner notes. Rand, a Russian-American Jewish novelist, and inventor of the philosophy of Objectivism, wrote the 1937 dystopian fictional novella Anthem, the plot of which bears several similarities to 2112. All members read the book. Peart added the credit to avoid any legal action. In the British paper NME, Barry Miles made allusions of the Rand influence to Nazism, which particularly offended Lee, whose parents were Holocaust survivors. The first and last sections, "Overture" and "Grand Finale", respectively, are instrumental and borrow a short sequence from 1812 Overture by Pyotr Tchaikovsky. The "Overture" features an introduction from graphic designer and musician Hugh Syme performed on an ARP Odyssey synthesizer with an Echoplex Delay pedal. Music writer and professor Rob Bowman calculated that in the entire piece, 2:34 of the song contains improvized guitar solos. "Overture" contains the lyric "And the meek shall inherit the earth", a reference to the Biblical passages Book of Psalms 37:11 and Matthew 5:5.

"2112" tells a story set in the city of Megadon in 2112, "where individualism and creativity are outlawed with the population controlled by a cabal of malevolent Priests who reside in the Temples of Syrinx". A galaxy-wide war resulted in the planets forcefully joining the Solar Federation (symbolized by the "Red Star"). By 2112, the world is controlled by the priests who take orders from giant banks of computers inside the temple. Music is unknown in this world absent of creativity and individuality, but in "Discovery", a nameless man finds a beaten guitar inside a cave and rediscovers the lost art of music. In "Presentation", the man takes the guitar to the priests at the temple, who say, "Yes, we know, it's nothing new; it's just a waste of time", and then proceed angrily to destroy it and banish him. Next, in "Oracle: The Dream", the man dreams of a new planet, established at the same time as the Solar Federation, where creative people live. He awakens, depressed that music is part of such a civilization and that he can never be part of it, and kills himself, in "Soliloquy", originally titled "Soliloquy of the Soul". Another planetary war begins in "Grand Finale", originally named "Denouement", resulting in the ambiguous spoken ending: "Attention all planets of the Solar Federation: We have assumed control". Peart described the ending as a "double surprise ... a real Hitchcock killer".

Side two 
Side two contains five individual songs that display the band's more traditional hard-rock sound and Lee's higher-pitched vocals featured on their previous albums. Lifeson said while having a title track more serious, the rest of the album was to be "just a little lighter and a little more fun". Bowman wrote that the variation of styles on side two offers "a very different listening experience" in comparison. Though the tracks are not specifically about the "2112" concept, they do contain ideas that can relate to its overall theme. Lee wrote the lyrics for "Tears" and Lifeson the lyrics to "Lessons", while Peart wrote the rest.

"A Passage to Bangkok" is a song about marijuana; Lee said it is "a travelogue for all the places in the world that grow the best weed". The track mentions a number of cities and countries, specifically Bogotá, Jamaica, Acapulco, Morocco, Bangkok, Lebanon, Afghanistan, and Kathmandu. Rush started to write "The Twilight Zone" at a time when they needed one more song to fill both sides of the vinyl record. The band were big fans of the television series The Twilight Zone and based the track on the stories written for it from its host, Rod Serling. "Lessons" is one of the few Rush songs written solely by Lifeson. For him, the process of songwriting is more seldom and spontaneous in comparison to dedicating time to write, rehearse and scrap parts that do not work. "Tears" is a romantic ballad and is the first Rush track to incorporate the Mellotron, which Syme performs. "Something for Nothing" is a song about freewill and decision making. Regarding this song, Peart states: "All those paeans to American restlessness and the American road carried a tinge of wistfulness, an acknowledgement of the hardships of the vagrant life, the notion that wanderlust could be involuntary, exile as much as freedom, and indeed, the understanding that freedom wasn't free. In the mid-1970s, the band was driving to a show in downtown Los Angeles, at the Shrine Auditorium, and I noticed some graffiti splattered across a wall: 'Freedom isn't free', and I adapted that for a song on 2112."

Artwork 
Also known as the 'Man in the Star' logo, the Starman emblem was adopted by Rush fans as a logo since its first appearance in the gatefold of 2112. Peart described the Starman in an interview with Creem magazine:

On the album art, the "collectivist mentality" is depicted as the Red Star of the Solar Federation, which, according to the plot, is a galaxy-wide federation that controls all aspects of life during the year 2112. The figure in the emblem is depicted as the "Hero". Hugh Syme, the creator of many of Rush's album covers, commented on the design: "The man is the hero of the story. That he is nude is just a classic tradition ... the pureness of his person and creativity without the trappings of other elements such as clothing. The red star is the evil red star of the Federation, which was one of Peart's symbols. We basically based that cover around the red star and that hero."

The logo also appears on seven other Rush album covers: on the backdrop behind Peart's drumkit in All the World's a Stage, their first live album released in 1976; in one of the pictures that is being moved in Moving Pictures; on Retrospective I; on Archives, a compilation album released in 1978; on their 1981 live album Exit...Stage Left, in the background amongst symbols from all their previous work; on their 2003 compilation The Spirit of Radio: Greatest Hits 1974–1987; and on their 2004 EP Feedback. It is also featured on the Canada Post stamp honouring Rush issued 19 July 2013. It also was featured on the front bass drum heads of Peart's drum kit from 1977 to 1983, and again on the 2004 R30 and 2015 R40 tours.

Reception

Cashbox praised the album, calling it "a valid and melodic tale ... the story/song is a definite cohesive listen".  They said of "Temples of Syrinx that it "combines growling guitars with an incredibly shrill lead vocal." In an article about 2112 for Creem, Dan Nooger wrote the album "features some significant Mellotron meanderings and amazingly eccentric lyrics".

2112 was included in IGN's list "10 Classic Prog Rock Albums".
In a reader's poll held by Rolling Stone, it placed second on the list of favourite Prog Rock albums.
AllMusic's Greg Prato (4.5 out of 5): "1976's 2112 proved to be their much sought-after commercial breakthrough and remains one of their most popular albums."

The Audio-Visual Preservation Trust of Canada, a non-profit Canadian charitable organization dedicated to promoting the preservation of Canada's audio-visual heritage, has sponsored MasterWorks, which annually recognizes twelve culturally significant Canadian classics from the film, radio, TV and music industries. In 2006, 2112 was one of the albums chosen to be preserved.

In 2018, the album won the Polaris Heritage Prize Audience Award in the 1976–1985 category.

Ultimate Classic Rock included the album on their list of the "Top 100 '70s Rock Albums". Prog readers voted 2112 the 15th best progressive rock album of all time.

Commercial performance
2112 was released on 1 April 1976, (or March 1976, according to some sources, including a review from Creem) on vinyl, 8-track cartridge, and cassette tape. It is worth noting that Mercury Records sent out a press release to various trade publications in mid-March, announcing the album as part of the label's March releases, along with Jailbreak by Thin Lizzy. It received strong promotion from Polydor, the distributor of Mercury Records albums, who issued an advertising campaign based on graphics on the album sleeve, in major trade publications. It became Rush's second album after Fly by Night to enter the top ten on the Canadian Albums Chart, peaking at No. 5. In the US, it peaked at No. 61 on the Billboard Top LPs & Tape chart, the week of 29 May 1976, during a 37-week stay on the chart. It also marked the band's first to crack the US top 100.

The album sold faster than any of Rush's previous albums. In June 1976, the album had outsold the band's past catalogue in Canada and the US, selling close to 35,000 and over 200,000 copies, respectively. 2112 became a strong seller in the US; it reached gold certification by the Recording Industry Association of America (RIAA) in November 1977 for selling 500,000 copies. In November 1995, the album reached triple platinum for selling over 3 million copies, becoming Rush's second-biggest seller after Moving Pictures.

Reissues

Tour 
Rush promoted 2112 with a concert tour of the United States, Canada, and for the first time in their career, across Europe, between February 1976 and June 1977. The tour saw the band perform over 140 shows. To make their set tighter, "Discovery" and "Oracle: The Dream" were omitted from the performance of the "2112" suite.  However, "Discovery" was performed on later performances of "2112" on tours for A Farewell to Kings and Hemispheres.  Rush would not perform the track in its entirety until their 1996 tour following the release of Test for Echo. The shows at Massey Hall in Toronto in June 1976 were recorded and compiled for release as their double live album All the World's a Stage, released in September 1976.

Track listing

Original release

40th Anniversary Edition (2016)

Personnel 
Credits are adapted from the album's 1976 liner notes.

Rush 
 Geddy Lee – vocals, bass
 Alex Lifeson – guitar
 Neil Peart – drums, percussion

Additional musician
 Hugh Syme – ARP Odyssey synthesizer, synth guitar, Mellotron on "Tears"

Production 
 Rush – production, arrangement
 Terry Brown – arrangement, production, recording, engineering, mixing
 Brian Lee – mastering
 Bob Ludwig – mastering
 Hugh Syme – graphics
 Yosh Inouye – photography
 Gerard Gentil – photography (band)
 Ray Danniels – management
 Vic Wilson – management
 Moon Records – executive production

Charts

Certifications

References

External links 
 

 2112  (Adobe Flash) at Radio3Net (streamed copy where licensed)

Rush (band) albums
1976 albums
Anthem Records albums
Mercury Records albums
Albums produced by Terry Brown (record producer)
Atlantic Records albums
Epic Records albums
Sony Music albums
Science fiction concept albums